State Route 383 (SR 383) is a  state highway in the east-central part of the U.S. state of Georgia. It is located within portions of Richmond and Columbia counties. It connects Fort Gordon with Martinez and Evans.

The highway is known as Jimmie Dyess Parkway from its southern terminus to an intersection with Park West Drive, one block south of the interchange with Interstate 20 (I-20). It is named after Lieutenant Colonel Aquilla James "Jimmie" Dyess, a United States Marine Corps officer who was a posthumous recipient of the Medal of Honor for "conspicuous gallantry and intrepidity at the risk of his life" at the head of his troops during World War II in the Battle of Kwajalein, on Roi-Namur, Kwajalein Atoll, Marshall Islands on February 2, 1944. The highway is also known as South Belair Road from Park West Drive to SR 232 (Columbia Road) and North Belair Road for the rest of its length. SR 383 serves as an important access route leading from Fort Gordon to the local area.

Route description

The highway heads northward, then curves north-northwesterly. It intersects Wrightsboro Road along the Columbia County line. Just south of an interchange with Interstate 20 (I-20; Carl Sanders Highway), the highway intersects both the eastern terminus of Park West Drive and the western terminus of Belair Frontage Road, where the local name changes from Jimmie Dyess Parkway to South Belair Road. After the I-20 interchange, SR 383 intersects Wheeler Road and travels along the Martinez–Evans line to an intersection with SR 232 (Columbia Road), where it takes on the North Belair Road local name. Immediately afterward, the highway enters Evans proper and curves to the northeast. In the main part of Evans, it has an intersection with the eastern terminus of Hereford Farm Road and the western terminus of Towne Centre Drive. Approximately  later, SR 383 meets its northern terminus, an intersection with SR 104 (Washington Road). Here, North Belair Road continues northwest of Martinez to SR 28 (Furys Ferry Road).

All of SR 383 is part of the National Highway System, a system of routes determined to be the most important for the nation's economy, mobility and defense.

History
The road that would eventually become SR 383 was built in 1960 along the same alignment as it travels today, however, it only traveled from about Wrightsboro Road to its northern terminus. By 1988, part of this section from the I-20 interchange to its northern terminus was designated as SR 383. By 1992, SR 383 was proposed to be extended southward to US 78/US 278/SR 10 (Gordon Highway). By 1999, the road was extended to its current southern terminus. It is unknown if this extension was designated as part of SR 383 at this time.

Major intersections

See also

References

External links

 
 Georgia Roads (Routes 381 - 399)

383
Transportation in Richmond County, Georgia
Transportation in Columbia County, Georgia
Transportation in Augusta, Georgia